Colour Index International is a reference database jointly maintained by the Society of Dyers and Colourists and the American Association of Textile Chemists and Colorists. It currently contains over 27,000 individual products listed under 13,000 Colour Index Generic Names. It was first printed in 1925 but is now published solely on the World Wide Web. The index serves as a common reference database of manufactured colour products and is used by manufacturers and consumers, such as artists and decorators.

Colorants (both dyes and pigments) are listed using a dual classification which use the Colour Index Generic Name (the prime identifier) and Colour Index Constitution Numbers. These numbers are prefixed with C.I. or CI, for example, C.I. 15510. (This abbreviation is sometimes mistakenly thought to be CL, due to the font used to display it.) A detailed record of products available on the market is presented under each Colour Index reference. For each product name, Colour Index International lists the manufacturer, physical form, and principal uses, with comments supplied by the manufacturer to guide prospective customers.

For manufacturers and consumers, the availability of a standard classification system for pigments is helpful because it resolves conflicting historic, proprietary, and generic names that have been applied to colours.

List of Colour Index Constitution Numbers 
The colour index numbers are 5-digit numbers grouped into numerical ranges according to the chemical structure.

Print editions 
1st (-)
2nd (1956) 
3rd (1971)

See also
 Color chart
 List of dyes
 Pantone

References

External links 
American Association of Textile Chemists and Colorists
Colour Index International 
Society of Dyers and Colourists

Color organizations
American companies established in 1925
1925 establishments in the United States
Business services companies established in 1925